The United Arab Emirates Government announced official holidays for the public and private sectors for the years 2019. The Cabinet granted equal leaves (14 days) sectors. This decision aims to achieve a balance between the two sectors in the number of official holidays they are entitled to.

2019 Holidays 

 For Eid Al-Fitr, Day of Arafah, Eid Al-Adha, Islamic New Year and The Prophet Muhammad’s Birthday are determined by Moon Sighting.

See also 
 Islamic calendar - for further expansion on the months and days identified above

References